The Dr. Thomas Simpson House is a historic house at 114 Main Street in Wakefield, Massachusetts.  It is a -story timber-frame house, in a local variant of Georgian style that is three bays wide and four deep, with a side gable roof.  Its primary entrance, facing west toward Lake Quannapowitt, has sidelight windows and pilasters supporting an entablature, while a secondary south-facing entrance has the same styling, except with a transom window instead of sidelights.  The core of this house was built by Dr. Thomas Simpson sometime before 1750, and has been added onto several times.  It was restyled in the Federal period, when the door surrounds would have been added.

The house was listed on the National Register of Historic Places in 1989.

See also
National Register of Historic Places listings in Wakefield, Massachusetts
National Register of Historic Places listings in Middlesex County, Massachusetts

References

Houses completed in 1750
Houses on the National Register of Historic Places in Wakefield, Massachusetts
Georgian architecture in Massachusetts
Federal architecture in Massachusetts
Houses in Wakefield, Massachusetts